McGlade is a surname. Notable people with the surname include:

Charlie McGlade, Irish republican
Christine McGlade (born 1963), Canadian digital media executive and actor
Jacqueline McGlade (born 1955), Canadian oceanographer
John E. McGlade (born 1954), American businessman